Dark Side of the Black Moon: What Planet Are We On? is an album by Acid Mothers Temple & The Melting Paraiso U.F.O., released in 2009 by Important Records. The album was released on CD and LP. The LP release was limited to 100 copies on blue vinyl and 100 copies on clear vinyl.

Track listing

Vinyl Edition
The tracks Universe In Witch's Blue and Intergalactic Space Trackin' are exclusive to the vinyl edition.

Personnel

 Kawabata Makoto - Electric Guitar, Bouzouki, Sitar], Violin, Speed Guru
 Tsuyama Atsushi - Monster Bass, Voice, Acoustic Guitar, Cosmic Joker
 Shimura Koji - Drums, Latino Cool
 Higashi Hiroshi - Synthesizer, Dancin' King

Technical personnel

 produced & engineered by Kawabata Makoto
 digital mastered by Yoshida Tatsuya
 packaging designed by Seldon Hunt

References

2009 albums
Acid Mothers Temple albums
Important Records albums
Acid rock albums